The SNCF Class X 72500 diesel multiple units were built by Alstom between 1997 and 2002. They operate longer distance Transport express régional and Intercites services, particularly in the areas south and west of Paris, the Paris to Laon line, around Tours, Nantes, Toulouse, Lyon, Dijon, Nevers, Grenoble, Bordeaux and the South Coast of France. They do not operate in the far north of France.

Description  
The X 72500 units come in two types:
90 two car sets (both vehicles powered )
15 three car sets (containing an intermediate unpowered trailer)
Three sets can be coupled where required

The engines drive a hydromechanical Voith transmission.
Additionally each vehicle also includes a  Perkins/Mecalte diesel generator for auxiliaries (lighting, air conditioning, door controls, etc..). The braking system is provided by  mechanical disc brakes coupled to a hydrodynamic engine brake.

The driving position, TGV type centered in the cab, was designed to facilitate the work of the driver. It also includes elements to enable Driver Only Operation (but the absence of CCTV/mirrors require a second crew member on board) and the ATESS system, a data recorder way more advanced than those fitted to previous stock. The overall management of the equipment is insured by an onboard computer system. Failures can be quickly diagnosed by it. Check levels of oil, fuel and coolant are the same computer.
Phase reliability of these railcars has also been particularly long, which earned them a bad reputation even today. Two back operations at the factory took place:
Retrofit 1, 1998 to mid- 1999, aimed to security changes and installing new versions of the onboard computer system;
Retrofit 2, from mid- 1999 to late 2000, where more than 200 modifications were made, mainly at the level of passenger comfort.
In 2006, recurrent problems still existed at the level of generators and devices for opening and closing doors.

Gallery

X 72700 as IC 4506 / 07 Lyon - Nantes arriving at St. Germain-des-Fosses on February 9th, 2017
Interior of X 72 700 on February 9th, 2017

Video: X 72 700 at YouTube (second part of Video)

72500
Diesel multiple units of France